The Bridgeton team was a minor league baseball team based in Bridgeton, New Jersey from 1895 to 1897.  Bridgeton played as members of the South New Jersey League from 1895 to 1896 and New Jersey State League in 1897. Bridgeton was without a known team moniker, common in the era.

History
Bridgeton first played as members of the Independent level South New Jersey League in 1895 and 1896. Standings, records and statistics from the league are unknown.

Minor league baseball continued in Bridgeton, New Jersey when the Bridgeton team played as a member of the 1897 New Jersey State League. The league was a four–team Class D level league. The New Jersey State League was formed with the teams in Asbury, Atlantic City and Millville joining Bridgeton as the charter members.

After beginning play on April 14, 1897, the New Jersey State League season ended on June 1, 1897. The player statistics and team records from the 1897 league are unknown. One source lists the team standings in the order of: Bridgeton, Millville, Asbury Park and Atlantic City, but without final records to align with the order of finish.

The New Jersey State League permanently folded after the 1897 season. Some sources also refer to Bridgeton as playing in a 1897 South New Jersey League with Clayton, Millville and Vineland, but no records or rosters exist. Bridgeton has not hosted another minor league team since 1897.

The ballpark
The name and location of the Bridgeton home ballpark in 1897 is not referenced. The Field site was in use in the era, located at 4 Burt Street, Bridgeton, New Jersey.

Timeline

Year–by–year record

Notable alumni
Alexander Donoghue (1895)
Heinie Kappel (1895) 
Joe Kappel (1895–1896)
Bill Rotes (1895)
Jack Scheible (1895)
Stan Yerkes (1896)
Roster information for the 1897 Bridgeton team is unknown

See also
Bridgeton (minor league baseball) players

References

External links
Bridgeton - Baseball Reference 

Defunct minor league baseball teams
New Jersey State League teams
Bridgeton, New Jersey
Baseball teams established in 1895
Baseball teams disestablished in 1897
Defunct baseball teams in New Jersey
Cumberland County, New Jersey
1895 establishments in New Jersey